Malu Vânăt may refer to several villages in Romania:

Malu Vânăt, a village in Merișani Commune, Argeș County
Malu Vânăt, a village in Izvoarele Commune, Prahova County

See also 
 Malu (disambiguation)